Mary Geaney is an Irish sportswoman. She played senior ladies' Gaelic football for Kerry, senior camogie for Cork and is also a former Ireland women's field hockey international. In 1976 she captained Kerry when they won the All-Ireland Senior Ladies' Football Championship and in 1980 she captained Cork when they won the All-Ireland Senior Camogie Championship. She was the first player to captain a team to both  championships. As a field hockey international, she was a member of the Ireland team that won the 1983 Women's Intercontinental Cup. In 2010 she was inducted into the Irish Hockey Association Hall of Fame.

Early years, family and education
Mary Geaney is the daughter of Con Geaney, a member of the Kerry team that won the 1932 All-Ireland Senior Football Championship. Her brother, David Geaney, was a member of the Kerry team that won the same All-Ireland championship in 1959. She was educated at the Ursuline Secondary School in Blackrock, Cork.

Ladies' Gaelic football
Geaney began playing ladies' Gaelic football for Castleisland Desmonds. In 1973 she played for Kerry against Cork in one of the first ladies' Gaelic football games between the two counties. Kerry won by 5–10 to 4–11 with Geaney scoring 2–6. In 1974 she played for Kerry when they lost to Tipperary in the first Munster Senior Ladies' Football Championship final. In 1976 she captained Kerry when they won the All-Ireland Senior Ladies' Football Championship, defeating Offaly by 4–6 to 1–5. With 3–2, Geany was also the top scorer in the final. She also scored the first ever hat-trick in a Ladies' All-Ireland final. Geaney also won the All-Ireland Ladies Club Football Championship with Castleisland Desmonds. She also represented Munster at interprovincial level.

Camogie
Geaney played camogie for Castleisland Desmonds and Éire Óg. Between 1978 and 1988 she also played for Cork in six All-Ireland Senior Camogie Championship finals. Geaney finished on the winning side in 1978, 1980 and 1983. In six finals she scored 7–5. In the 1978 final she scored a hat-trick of goals and in 1980 she captained the winning Cork team. She also represented Munster at interprovincial level in the Gael Linn Cup.

Field hockey

Geaney played field hockey for Old Ursulines (Cork), Munster and Ireland. She made her senior international debut in 1971 against England. She subsequently made 61 senior appearances for Ireland. She was a member of the Ireland teams that won the 1977 Triple Crown and the 1983 Women's Intercontinental Cup. In 2010, together with her former team mate, Margaret Gleghorne, she was inducted into the Irish Hockey Association Hall of Fame.

Other sports
Geaney has also played squash, badminton and golf for Munster. She is a member of the Killarney Golf & Fishing Club.

Honours

Ladies' Gaelic football
Kerry
All-Ireland Senior Ladies' Football Championship
Winners: 1976
Castleisland Desmonds 
All-Ireland Ladies Club Football Championship
Winners: 1980, 1983

Camogie
Cork
All-Ireland Senior Camogie Championship
Winners: 1978, 1980, 1983 
Runners Up: 1981, 1987, 1988
National Camogie League
Winners: 1986
Runners Up: 1977–78, 1981, 1982
Munster
Gael Linn Cup
Runners Up: 1979, 1983
UCC
Ashbourne Cup
Winners:

Field hockey
Ireland
Women's Intercontinental Cup
Winners: 1983  
Triple Crown
Winners: 1977

References

1954 births
Living people
Cork camogie players
Kerry inter-county ladies' footballers
Castleisland Gaelic footballers
Irish female field hockey players
Ireland international women's field hockey players
Female field hockey goalkeepers
Sportspeople from County Kerry
Dual camogie–football players
UCC camogie players